The 8 municipalities of the Central Ostrobothnia Region in Finland are divided on two sub-regions.


Kaustinen sub-region 

Halsua (Halso)
Kaustinen (Kaustby)
Lestijärvi
Perho
Toholampi
Veteli (Vetil)

Kokkola sub-region 

Kannus
Kokkola (Karleby)

See also 
Western Finland
Regions of Western Finland

External links